Events in the year 2021 in Iraq.

Incumbents
President: Barham Salih 
Prime Minister: Mustafa Al-Kadhimi

Events 
 21 January – Suicide bombers kill at least 30 people at an open-air market in Baghdad.
 10-14 February – Turkey launches Operation Claw-Eagle 2 in Iraqi Kurdistan region
 15 February – The capital of Iraqi Kurdistan, Erbil, is struck by multiple missiles.
 7 March – Pope Francis visits Iraq and holds prayer in the al-Tahera Church, an ancient church destroyed by Islamic State. Amid the ruins, he called for peace and prayed for the victims of the conflict with the ISIL. 
 24 April – A fire at a COVID-19 hospital in Baghdad kills at least 82 people in one of the worst fires in Iraqi history.
 9 May – Protests erupt in Karbala after the killing of prominent rights activist Ihab Jawad Al-Wazni.
 12 July – A blaze at Al-Hussein Teaching Hospital in Nasiriyah kills 92 people and injures about 100 others.
 19 July - A suicide bombing at an open-air market in Baghdad kills at least 35 people.
 5 November - 2021 Baghdad clashes
 7 November - Attempted assassination of Mustafa Al-Kadhimi

Deaths 
 28 January — Abu Yasser al-Issawi, Islamic militant (b. 1978)
 15 February — Rowsch Shaways, politician (b. 1947)
 28 February — Sabah Abdul-Jalil, football player (b. 1951)
 12 March — Khairuddin Haseeb, journalist (b. 1929)
 22 March — Zuhur Dixon, poet (b. 1933)

See also

Country overviews
 Iraq
 History of Iraq
 History of modern Iraq
 Outline of Iraq
 Government of Iraq
 Politics of Iraq
 Timeline of Iraq history
 Years in Iraq

Related timelines for current period
 2021 in politics and government

References

 
Iraq
Iraq
2020s in Iraq
Years of the 21st century in Iraq